The Red Widow is a lost 1916 American silent romantic comedy film directed by James Durkin,  produced by Famous Players-Lasky, and distributed by Paramount Pictures. The film was based on a 1911 Broadway musical play The Red Widow by Channing Pollock and Rennold Wolf and starring comedian Raymond Hitchcock. John Barrymore stars in this film in the Hitchcock part of Cicero Butts. Hitchcock's wife, Flora Zabelle, is the leading lady in this film.

Cast 
John Barrymore as Cicero Hannibal Butts
Flora Zabelle Hitchcock as Anna Varvara (credited as Flora Zabelle)
John Hendricks as Baron Strickoutvich
Eugene Redding as Ivan Scorpioff
Millard Benson as Basil Romanoff
George E. Mack as Popova
Lillian Tucker as Mrs. Butts
E.L. Fernandez as Captain Roman (credited as Mr. Fernandez)

unbilled
John Goldsworthy

Production 
This particular comedy film was shot twice. The negative for the first version of The Red Widow burned up in a nitrate fire before the distribution prints could be made. This was probably the same Famous Players fire of September 11, 1915, that destroyed the first version of Mary Pickford's Esmeralda (1915). Barrymore and the cast reshot the film for no salary.

References

External links 

Period promotional photo of John Barrymore with reverse-side info on The Red Widow film
Movie poster / trade or press sheet (archived)

1910s romantic comedy films
1916 lost films
1916 films
American black-and-white films
American romantic comedy films
American films based on plays
American silent feature films
Famous Players-Lasky films
Lost American films
Lost romantic comedy films
1916 comedy films
1910s American films
Silent romantic comedy films
Silent American comedy films
1910s English-language films